The 2014 Western Michigan Broncos football team represented Western Michigan University (WMU) in the 2014 NCAA Division I FBS football season. They were led by second-year head coach P. J. Fleck and played their home games at Waldo Stadium as a member of the West Division of the Mid-American Conference (MAC). They finished the season 8–5, 6–2 in MAC play to finish in third place in the West Division. They were invited to the Famous Idaho Potato Bowl where they lost to Air Force.

WMU lost its season opener against Purdue, 43–34. Freshman running back Jarvion Franklin rushed for 163 yards and three touchdowns on 19 carries. The 163 yards were the third-highest by a freshman in the NCAA. He was named MAC West Offensive Player of the Week.

At the end of the 2014 season, head coach P. J. Fleck was awarded with the Mid American Conference Head Coach of the Year award. Jarvion Franklin was named the MAC Offensive Player of the Year, becoming the first freshman to ever receive the honor.

Previous season
In 2013, the Broncos finished at 1–11 (1–7 MAC), tied for fifth place in the MAC West division. Redshirt sophomore wide receiver Jaime Wilson, the 2012 MAC Freshman of the Year, transferred in the offseason to be closer to home.

Recruiting class

Schedule

Schedule source:

Coaching staff

References

Western Michigan
Western Michigan Broncos football seasons
Western Michigan Broncos football